"Don't Let Me Be Misunderstood" is a song written by Bennie Benjamin, Horace Ott and Sol Marcus for the American singer-songwriter and pianist Nina Simone, who recorded the first version in 1964. "Don't Let Me Be Misunderstood" has been covered by many artists. Two of the covers were transatlantic hits, the first in 1965 by The Animals, which was a blues rock version; and a 1977 by the disco group Santa Esmeralda, which was a four-on-the-floor rearrangement. A 1986 cover by new wave musician Elvis Costello found success in Britain and Ireland.

Nina Simone original 

Composer and arranger Horace Ott came up with the melody and chorus lyrics after a temporary falling out with his girlfriend (and wife-to-be), Gloria Caldwell. Ott then brought it to writing partners Bennie Benjamin and Sol Marcus to complete. However, when it came time for songwriting credits, rules of the time prevented BMI writers (Ott) from officially collaborating with ASCAP members (Benjamin and Marcus), so Ott listed Caldwell's name instead of his own on the credits.

"Don't Let Me Be Misunderstood" was one of five songs written by Benjamin and Marcus and presented for Nina Simone's 1964 album Broadway-Blues-Ballads. There, the song was taken at a very slow tempo and arranged around the harp and other orchestral elements including a backing choir that appears at several points. Simone sings it in her typically difficult-to-categorize style.

To some writers, this version of "Don't Let Me Be Misunderstood" carried the subtext of the Civil Rights Movement that concerned much of Simone's work of the time; while to others this was more personal, and was the song, and phrase, that best exemplified Simone's career and life.

The Animals version 

The Animals' lead singer Eric Burdon would later say of the song, "It was never considered pop material, but it somehow got passed on to us and we fell in love with it immediately."

The song was recorded in November 1964. The band became a trans-Atlantic hit in early 1965 for their rendition of the song, rising to No. 3 on the UK Singles Chart, No. 15 on the U.S. pop singles chart, and No. 4 in Canada.

Cash Box described it as "a striking combination of R&B and English-rock touches."  This single was ranked by Rolling Stone at No. 322 on their list of the 500 Greatest Songs of All Time.

During Animals concerts at the time, the group maintained the recorded arrangement, but Burdon sometimes slowed the vocal line down to an almost spoken part, recapturing a bit of the Simone flavor.

At the South by Southwest festival in 2012, Bruce Springsteen credited the song as the inspiration and the riff for his song "Badlands".

Santa Esmeralda version 

A disco version of the song by the group Santa Esmeralda, which took The Animals' arrangement and transformed into a disco, flamenco, and other Latin rhythm and ornamentation elements to it, also became a hit in the late 1970s. Their version of the song was first released in summer 1977 as a 16-minute epic that took up an entire side of their Don't Let Me Be Misunderstood album which was picked up for greater worldwide distribution by their label at the time, Casablanca Records. The 12-inch club remix was extremely popular, reached No. 1 on the U.S. Billboard Club Play Singles chart and in some European countries as well. Though, the single peaked at No. 4 on the Hot Dance/Disco-Club Play chart.

Instrumental sections of this version were used in the 2003 Quentin Tarantino film Kill Bill: Volume I, during the final fight between The Bride and O-Ren Ishii.

Charts

Weekly charts

Year-end charts

Certifications

Elvis Costello version 

British new wave musician Elvis Costello, under the label "The Costello Show", covered "Don't Let Me Be Misunderstood" for his 1986 album, King of America. The song was a late addition to the album; Costello had originally intended to record "I Hope You're Happy Now", but throat problems during the final sessions prevented him from doing so. Costello recalled,

Against Costello's wishes, his American record company, Columbia, insisted on releasing the song as the first single from King of America. The single reached No. 33 in the UK and No. 22 in Ireland, but did not chart in the US. He explained, "My US record company, Columbia, showed their customary imagination in releasing the safe 'cover' song as a single ahead of any of the more unusual and heartfelt balladry I had composed. 'Don't Let Me Be Misunderstood' made little impression, and my mounting debt to the company seemed to make them unwilling to risk any further effort on my behalf".

Martin Chilton of The Telegraph ranked the song as Costello's 26th best song out of 40, stating that Costello "sings it really well".

Chart history

Weekly charts 

 The Animals

 Ginette Reno

 Santa Esmeralda

 Elvis Costello (The Costello Show)

 Joe Cocker

Year-end charts 

 The Animals

 Santa Esmeralda

Reviewed versions 
Stereogum reviewed cover versions of the song in 2015, including renditions by Joe Cocker, Yusuf Islam, and Lana Del Rey. A version by Cocker for his With a Little Help from My Friends album is "a thoroughly '60s rock reading, [...] even if it dispenses with the organ intro the Animals introduced into the equation, it does have a big organ solo section and that crying blues guitar intro". Cat Stevens converted to Islam and changed his name to Yusuf Islam; when he returned to popular music, he recorded an allusion to controversies in his life by way of "Don't Let Me Be Misunderstood", as featured on his 2006 album An Other Cup. Del Rey created a "burnt-out Pop Art take on Americana" version of the song for her album Honeymoon.

References 

1964 singles
1964 songs
1965 singles
1977 singles
The Animals songs
Blues rock songs
Casablanca Records singles
Columbia Graphophone Company singles
Columbia Records singles
Disco songs
Jazz songs
Lana Del Rey songs
MGM Records singles
Nina Simone songs
Number-one singles in Germany
Philips Records singles
Santa Esmeralda songs
Song recordings produced by Mickie Most
Songs written by Bennie Benjamin
Songs written by Sol Marcus